Winlock may refer to:

People
 Anna Winlock, astronomer
 Herbert Eustis Winlock, archaeologist
 Joseph Winlock (astronomer)

Places
 Winlock, Washington
 Winlock (crater)

See also 
 Winlocker - a name for Ransomware